Stephen Eric Pearcy (born July 3, 1956) is an American musician. He is best known as the founder, singer, songwriter and sole remaining original member of the heavy metal band Ratt. He has also created the bands Firedome, Crystal Pystal, Arcade (band), Vicious Delite, and Vertex. He has also recorded seven albums as a solo artist.

Career

In his early teens, Pearcy aspired to be a top fuel race car driver and expressed no desire to pursue a career in music. He listened to music and occasionally went to concerts in the 1970s; however, he had not so much as played a note in his whole life. One night during the summer of 1970, a hit-and-run driver struck Pearcy while he was riding his bicycle. While he was in the hospital for six months recovering from his accident, someone gave him an acoustic guitar. After fiddling around with the guitar for a short time, Pearcy decided to shift his vocational focus from driving race cars to playing music. He created the bands Firedome and Crystal Pystal. Pearcy also wrote music for a band that he named Mickey Ratt (formed in San Diego in 1977). Pearcy moved his band to Los Angeles in 1980 after seeing a local band, Van Halen, at The Whisky a Go Go.

After Pearcy and the band moved to Los Angeles in 1980, the band's name was shortened to Ratt in 1981 and the original lineup was solidified in 1983. Playing clubs like The Troubadour, The Roxy and The Whisky, Ratt amassed a large local following. After releasing an eponymous six-song EP in 1983 that sold 200,000 copies, Ratt released its breakthrough album, Out of the Cellar, on Atlantic Records in 1984. The band opened arena shows and tours for ZZ Top, Ozzy Osbourne and Billy Squier. "Out of the Cellar" went five times multi-platinum, and the band headed its own arena tours around the world for the next ten years. After releasing four multi-platinum records and three gold albums with Ratt, Pearcy left the band in 1992.

Pearcy and former Cinderella drummer Fred Coury formed the band Arcade in 1992. Arcade released a self-titled album in 1993 and another album the following year. In 1996, Pearcy dabbled in an industrial metal band called Vertex (with Megadeth's Al Pitrelli and drummer / electronic producer Hiro Kuretani).

Pearcy reunited with Ratt in 1996 (minus Robbin Crosby and Juan Croucier) only to leave the band for a second time in 2000 on the eve of a tour due to differences over financial allocation amongst band members.

Pearcy rejoined Ratt in 2006 before leaving again on April 24, 2014, explaining he was "officially done with having anything to do with them due to the constant turmoil, unresolved business, personal attacks/threats in the public forum, and most of all, the disrespect to the fans".

On November 29, 2016, Pearcy and other members of Ratt announced the upcoming Back for More Tour.

A new Ratt lineup including Jordan Ziff (lead guitars) and drummer Pete Holmes (from the band Black and Blue) performed a handful of shows in late 2018 and embarked on a world tour starting in May 2019.

In April 2020, Pearcy appeared with Ratt in a GEICO insurance commercial where new homeowners lament that they "have a Ratt problem."

Pearcy has recorded four solo records under his own indie label Top Fuel Records. The latest, "View to a Thrill", was released on Frontiers Music/Top Fuel Records in November 2018; the music from the album was written by Pearcy and guitarist Erik Ferentinos.

Personal life
Pearcy is divorced and lives with his fiancé, Kristi Adair. He has a daughter from his first marriage. She was born July 25, 1995.

Health
Pearcy underwent knee replacement surgery in 2019, three months after two Ratt shows that saw him incapacitated to the point where he had difficulty remembering the words to some of the band's songs.

On July 29, 2021, Pearcy revealed that he had been diagnosed with liver cancer three years earlier. He explained that he found out about the cancer through a blood test, and that he also had hepatitis.

In the rockumentary "Nothing to Lose: A Stephen Pearcy Rockumentary" (2021), produced and directed by Kristi Adair, Pearcy confirmed that he beat his liver cancer after having had chemotherapy and an ablation procedure that removed his cancer completely. He was subsequently on a maintenance program to make certain that his cancer did not return. As of 2022, four years after having been diagnosed, he was still completely free of cancer.

Stephen Pearcy solo band members

Stephen Pearcy – lead vocals, guitar, writer (1980–present)
Erik Ferentinos – lead guitar, backing vocals, co-writer (2005–present)
Matt Thorne – bass, keyboards, backing vocals (2005, 2013–present)
Greg D Angelo / Scott Coogan – drums (2018–present)
Johnny Monaco – guitar, backing vocals (2022–present)

Discography

References

External links
Stephen Pearcy Official Website

1959 births
Living people
20th-century American singers
21st-century American singers
American heavy metal singers
American male singer-songwriters
American rock songwriters
Glam metal musicians
Musicians from San Diego
Ratt members
Singer-songwriters from California